The 1980 UEFA European Under-21 Championship, which spanned two years (1978–80) had 25 entrants. Cyprus and the Netherlands competed in the competition for the first time. 1978 entrants Austria did not enter. Due to 'irregularities', Turkey's first two matches were awarded (3-0) to their opponents.  USSR U-21s won the competition.

The 25 national teams were divided into eight groups (seven groups of 3 + one group of 4).    The group winners played off against each other on a two-legged home-and-away basis until the winner was decided.  There was no finals tournament or 3rd-place playoff.

Qualifying stage

Draw
The allocation of teams into qualifying groups was based on that of UEFA Euro 1980 qualifying with several changes, reflecting the absence of some nations:
 Group 1 did not include Northern Ireland and Republic of Ireland
 Group 2 did not include Austria 
 Group 3 did not include Romania (moved to Group 7)
 Group 4 did not include Switzerland (moved to Group 8) and Iceland 
 Group 5 did not include Luxembourg (moved to Group 8)
 Group 6 did not include Hungary (moved to Group 7)
 Group 7 did not include West Germany, Wales and Malta, but included Romania (moved from Group 3) and Hungary (moved from Group 6)
 Group 8 composed of Switzerland (moved from Group 4), Luxembourg (moved from Group 5) and Italy (who did not participate in senior Euro qualification)

Qualified teams

1 Bold indicates champion for that year

Squads
See 1980 UEFA European Under-21 Championship squads

Knockout stages

References

External links 
 Results Archive at uefa.com
 RSSSF Results Archive ''at rsssf.com

UEFA European Under-21 Championship
UEFA
UEFA
1980 in youth association football